Washington Township is one of thirteen townships in Owen County, Indiana, United States. As of the 2010 census, its population was 6,164 and it contained 2,755 housing units.

History
Washington Township was organized in 1819. It was named for George Washington.

The CCC Recreation Building-Nature Museum, McCormick's Creek State Park Entrance and Gatehouse, Secrest-Wampler House, and Stone Arch Bridge over McCormick's Creek are listed on the National Register of Historic Places.

Geography
The White River defines the northeastern border of the township.

Cities, towns, villages
 Spencer

Unincorporated towns
 Hancock Corner at 
 Highets Corner at 
 Romona at 
 Southport at 
(This list is based on USGS data and may include former settlements.)

Cemeteries
The township contains these seven cemeteries: Blair, Chambersville, Mount Moriah, River Hill, Riverside, Rose and Witham.

Major highways
  U.S. Route 231
  Indiana State Road 46
  Indiana State Road 67

Airports and landing strips
 Miller Airport

School districts
 Spencer-Owen Community Schools

Political districts
 State House District 46
 State Senate District 37

References
 
 United States Census Bureau 2009 TIGER/Line Shapefiles
 IndianaMap

External links
 Indiana Township Association
 United Township Association of Indiana
 City-Data.com page for Washington Township

Townships in Owen County, Indiana
Townships in Indiana